Khajjiar is a hill station, near town of Chamba in Chamba district, Himachal Pradesh, India, located approximately  from Dalhousie.

Khajjiar lies on a small plateau with a small stream-fed lake in the middle that has been covered over with weeds. The hill station is surrounded by meadows and forests. It is part of the Kalatop Khajiar Sanctuary.

Khajiar can be reached from Dalhousie, the nearest major town and hill station, by bus in an hour or so. It has a rare combination of three ecosystems: lake, pasture, and forest.

Mini Switzerland

On 7 July 1992, Swiss Envoy Willy P. Blazer, Vice-Counsellor and Head of Chancery of Switzerland in India brought Khajjiar on the world tourism map by calling it "Mini Switzerland". He also put a sign of a yellow Swiss hiking footpath showing Khajjiar's distance from the Swiss capital Bern: ". Khajjiar is among the 160 locations in the world that bears a topographical resemblance with Switzerland. The counselor also took a stone from Khajjiar which will form part of a stone collage around the Swiss Parliament to remind the visitors of Khajjiar as a "Mini Switzerland of India".

Accommodation

There is a hotel and some cottages run by HP Tourism at Khajjiar where the tourists can stay. Besides that, there are two rest houses, one each of P.W.D. and Forest Department. A couple of private hotels have also come up, which do not match the above places in terms of location and amenities.

Travel
Most tourists travel to Khajjiar by private or rented vehicles. Bus service to and from Khajjiar is limited and timing changes according to local demands.

Places of interest
The best entertainment in Khajjiar is to walk around the lake or to go for long walks in the thick pine forests. Children enjoy this place because of the freedom of movement and the sloped terrain which permits them to roll down to the lake without getting hurt. Some other attractions include horse riding and paragliding. There is a huge Hanuman Statue and a park.

Dauladhar mountains
Dense deodars, pines and lush green meadows are characteristics of Khajjiar. Since Khajjiar is situated at the base of the Dauladhar mountains, the tourists here can get panoramic views of the mountains.

Kalatop Khajjiar Sanctuary

The Kalatop Khajjiar Sanctuary is a wildlife sanctuary which has a wide variety of flora and fauna. It is densely covered with deodar and fir forest. The place is a favourite spot for picnics and trekking.

Khajjiar Lake

Khajjiar Lake is a small lake, surrounded by saucer-shaped lush green meadow and a floating island. The dense growth of weed called vacha has made its earth spongy. Now the banks stand covered by a thick layer of earth, formed by the years of dust settling down on the weeds.

Khajji Nag temple
A little away from the lake is the temple of Khajji Nag belonging to the 12th century CE made by the king of Chamba, Prithvi Singh. The temple has a golden dome due to which it is also known as Golden Devi Temple. In the mandapa of the temple one can see the images of the Pandavas and the defeated Kauravas hanging from the roof of the circumambulatory path. The sanctum of the temple has been carved from wood. This temple is dedicated to snake (Nāga) worship and there are some snake idols inside. The temple also houses idols of Shiva and the Goddess Hadimba.

Trekking
Khajjiar offers numerous trekking opportunities. Khajjiar to Dainkund is a  easy to moderate trek. The trek starts  from Khajjiar on the Dalhousie-Khajjiar road and ends at Pholani Devi Temple at Dainkund. This trek with a well-defined trail and moderate ascent is an excellent trek for beginners and children. The trek offers excellent views and a beautiful camping site.

Gallery

References

External links

Expert Bulletin Khajjiar Travel guide

Cities and towns in Chamba district
Grasslands of India
Hill stations in Himachal Pradesh